Secernin-3 (SCRN3) is a protein that is encoded by the human SCRN3 gene. SCRN3 belongs to the peptidase C69 family and the secernin subfamily. As a part of this family, the protein is predicted to enable cysteine-type exopeptidase activity and dipeptidase activity, as well as be involved in proteolysis. It is ubiquitously expressed in the brain, thyroid, and 25 other tissues. Additionally, SCRN3 is conserved in a variety of species, including mammals, birds, fish, amphibians, and invertebrates. SCRN3 is predicted to be an integral component of the cytoplasm.

Gene 
SCRN3 is also commonly known as FLJ23142 and SES3.

Locus 

Homo sapiens secernin-3 (SCRN3) is a protein-coding gene. It can be found on chromosome 2, with its specific location being 2q31.1, on the '+' strand. The gene is 33,846 base pairs long and contains 8 exons.

Transcript 
The most common transcript of the SCRN3 protein-coding gene is transcript variant 1, which is 3052 base pairs long. SCRN3 is expressed at a high level, 2.4 times the average gene in this release.

Human SCRN3 has 8 different isoforms.

Expression 
The mRNA of SCRN3 was found to be moderate in humans. SCRN3 is expressed in most major tissues. The mRNA is expressed at slightly elevated levels in the brain, thyroid, heart, and prostate relative to other tissues, though the underlying trend was relatively consistent ubiquitous expression among various tissues.

In an analysis of SCRN3 in situ hybridization of both mouse brain and embryo, no specific areas of strong expression were located, instead showing a moderate expression throughout, confirming that SCRN3 likely has ubiquitous expression within most tissues. Immunohistochemistry data also indicated that human SCRN3 has low tissue, single cell, immune cell, and brain region specificity, once again adding to the evidence of ubiquitous expression.

Protein 
Transcript variant 1 of the SCRN3 gene encodes the most common protein isoform, secernin-3 isoform 1, which is 424 amino acids long. The molecular weight of the unmodified SCRN3 protein is approximately 48.413 kDa  and the theoretical isoelectric point (pI) of SCRN3 is 5.38. The theoretical isoelectric point, coupled with a predominance of acidic amino acids in the protein's composition, suggest that SCRN3 is a relatively acidic protein.

Additionally, the relative protein abundance of SCRN3 in humans was found to be moderately high compared to other human proteins, at 6.13 ppm.

Domains 
SCRN3 has a single notable domain, identified as the Peptidase_C69 Domain, or PepD domain for short. This domain spans from amino acid position 5 to 226 of the protein. The sequences found within this domain are characteristic of the Peptidase C69 family, and more specifically the Secernin subfamily, known to be mainly dipeptidases. Within this family, comparative sequence and structural analysis revealed a cysteine as the catalytic nucleophile, a feature that can be found on Secernin-3.

Structure 

Within the predicted tertiary structure of SCRN3, the most highly conserved amino acids were found predominantly within the internal portion of the protein. This suggests that the most conserved amino acids, being on the inside, are important to providing the structure of the protein, as well as providing internal functionality.

Localization 
Within the cell, SCRN3 is predicted to be primarily expressed in the cytoplasm. The cytoplasmic localization prediction was consistent among 5 additional orthologs (Mauremys reevesii, Gallus gallus, Microcaecilia unicolor, Danio rerio, & Anopheles gambiae), confirming the predicted cytoplasmic subcellular localization of human SCRN3.

Post-Translational Modifications 

SCRN3 is subject to several predicted post-translational modifications, including phosphorylation, ubiquitylation, sumoylation, lysine acetylation, and O-beta-GlcNAc attachment sites, among others.

Additionally, Secernin-3 provided the first example of a predicted naturally occurring N-terminal glyoxylyl (Glox) electrophile through the use of reverse-polarity activity-based protein profiling (RP-ABPP). Using hydrazine probes, it was confirmed that the cysteine (Cys) residue was post-translationally converted to Glox. This identified an electrophilic n-terminal glyoxylyl group for the first time in secernin-3, though the functions of both the protein and Glox as a cofactor have not yet been experimentally validated.

Homology/Evolution

Paralogs 

SCRN3 has two known paralogs, SCRN2 and SCRN1, which share a 67.4% and 63.8% similarity to the SCRN3 protein sequence, respectively. Both paralogs are moderately related to SCRN3. SCRN2 was found within the same species groups as SCRN3. SCRN1 was conserved in fewer species groups, including mammals, birds, reptiles, amphibians, and cartilaginous fish, but not in other fish or invertebrates.

Orthologs 

Over 100 orthologs exist for the human gene SCRN3. The known orthologs were found to exist in vertebrates and invertebrates, but not in plants, bacteria, or fungi. The divergence date of 20 orthologs found were compared relative to Homo sapiens. Invertebrates are the most distantly related orthologs to human SCRN3, with the furthest median date of divergence from this set of orthologs being 694 million years ago.

Evolution 

The relative rate of molecular evolution for SCRN3 was moderately high, being slightly lower than the evolution rate of Fibrinogen Alpha, and more rapid than the evolution rate of Cytochrome C. SCRN3 is estimated to have first appeared in invertebrates approximately 694 million years ago, evolving to eventually being found in humans.

Interacting Proteins 
A search of PSCQUIC identified 5 proteins that interact with human SCRN3 protein.

References 

Genetics
Proteins
Genes on human chromosome 2